Alcuronium chloride (formerly marketed as Alloferin) is a neuromuscular blocking (NMB) agent, alternatively referred to as a skeletal muscle relaxant. It is a semi-synthetic substance prepared from C-toxiferine I, a bis-quaternary alkaloid obtained from Strychnos toxifera. C-toxiferine I itself has been tested for its pharmacological action and noted to be a very long acting neuromuscular blocking agent For a formal definition of the durations of actions associated with NMB agents, see page for gantacurium. The replacement of both the N-methyl groups with N-allyl moieties yielded N,N-diallyl-bis-nortoxiferine, now recognized as alcuronium.

Inclusion of the allylic functions presented an enhanced potential area of biotransformation, and thus alcuronium is observed to have a much shorter duration of neuromuscular blocking action than its parent C-toxiferine I. It also has a more rapid onset of action, and is ~1.5 times as potent as tubocurarine. The pharmacological action of alcuronium is readily reversed by neostigmine, and it produces little histamine release. The major disadvantage of alcuronium is that it elicits a vagolytic effect produced by a selective atropine-like blockade of cardiac muscarinic receptors.

Effects 

 Cardiovascular system: histamine release and blockage of the sympathetic ganglia including adrenal medulla could cause hypotension 
 Respiratory system: apnea due to phrenic blockage but bronchoconstriction can occur from the histamine release
 Central nervous system: no effect on intraocular pressure
 Autonomic ganglion blockade can cause a decrease in gut motility

Special points 

 Duration of action prolonged in states of low potassium, calcium and protein, also in states of high magnesium and acidosis.
 Pharmaceutically incompatible with thiopentone
 Infusion can cause fixed dilated pupils

See also 
 The International Pharmacopoeia

References

Further reading
 
 
 
 

Allyl compounds
Muscle relaxants
Neuromuscular blockers
Nicotinic antagonists
Hoffmann-La Roche brands